The New Caledonian snipe (Coenocorypha neocaledonica) is an extinct species of austral snipe, described from late Holocene cave deposits on the French island of New Caledonia in the western Pacific Ocean. The specific epithet is a latinisation of the name of its island home.

Description
Although austral snipe are small birds, the endemic New Caledonian form was larger than all its congeners, with the exception of the Viti Levu snipe (C. miratropica). Examination of its wing bones suggest that it was a relatively strong flier.

Extinction
The species became extinct within about 1000 years of human settlement of the island, probably as a result of predation by human introduced rats.

References

Fossil taxa described in 2013
Birds described in 2013
Coenocorypha
Holocene extinctions
Extinct birds of New Caledonia
Taxa named by Trevor H. Worthy